Star Trek: The Next Generation/Doctor Who: Assimilation2 is an eight-issue limited series comic book written by Scott and David Tipton, assisted by Tony Lee on issues 1 to 4, with art by J.K. Woodward. The series is published by IDW Publishing with the first issue released in May 2012.  These were collected in two graphic novels published on 9 October 2012 and 26 February 2013.  It is a cross-over featuring the science-fiction series Doctor Who and Star Trek: The Next Generation. In it, the Doctor and his companions, Amy Pond and Rory Williams, encounter the crew of the USS Enterprise-D, and join together to stop an alliance between the Borg and the Cybermen.

Plot

On stardate 45635.2 (falling between the stardates of The Next Generation episodes "The Outcast" and "Cause and Effect"), the  Federation planet Delta IV comes under attack from a combined force of Borg and the Cybermen who were first seen in "Rise of the Cybermen". This  prompted a planetary evacuation.

Meanwhile, the TARDIS, with the Eleventh Doctor, Amy Pond, and Rory Williams inside, somehow crosses between universes and lands on the holodeck of the Enterprise-D. Though confused at having new memories from this universe, the Doctor meets with the ship's captain, Jean-Luc Picard, and they soon discover the Borg/Cybermen alliance. However, the Cybermen quickly turn on the Borg, prompting the Borg to ask Picard for assistance, to which he reluctantly agrees. Among the new memories the Doctor recalls is how his fourth incarnation encountered an earlier generation of Cybermen alongside James T. Kirk and his Enterprise.

The Enterprise crew begins work on adding gold to its weapons, since it is effective against Cybermen, while the TARDIS goes back in time to retrieve a vital piece of Borg technology that had been lost to the Cybermen. A strike force led by the Doctor and Picard then infiltrates the Cybermen's main vessel and, with the help of the Enterprises gold-enhanced weapons, defeats the Cybermen. The Doctor and his companions return to their own universe aboard the TARDIS; meanwhile the Borg, intrigued by the Doctor, decide to investigate time travel.

References

2012 comics debuts
Comics based on television series
Crossover comics
Intercompany crossovers
IDW Publishing titles
Science fiction comics
Eleventh Doctor stories
Cybermen stories
Comics based on Doctor Who
Comics based on Star Trek
Doctor Who crossovers
Doctor Who multi-Doctor stories
Fourth Doctor stories
Fiction set in the 24th century
Comics about time travel
Comics about parallel universes